Plan V is a Mexican film directed by Fez Noriega. The film is stars Natasha Dupeyrón, María Gabriela de Faría, and José Pablo Minor, and premiered on 17 August 2018.

Principal photography began on 19 December 2016, and concluded on 21 January 2017.

Plot 
Paula (Natasha Dupeyrón) prepares to give an anniversary surprise to her boyfriend Chema, a famous telenovela actor. But the surprise is hers, however, when she finds him cheating on her with his agent Marcelo (David Alegre). Paula, in the company of her friends Fernanda (María Gabriela de Faría) and Jennifer (Stephanie Gerard), comes to the conclusion that what she needs to get rid of disappointment is a virgin man who will surely value her. The three friends come up with Plan V (virgin), that introduces them in the fascinating and, until then, unknown world of the university, in which they will find a series of endearing characters, among them Luis (José Pablo Minor), a handsome and intelligent virgin that will change their lives.

Cast 
 Natasha Dupeyrón as Paula
 María Gabriela de Faría as Fernanda
 José Pablo Minor as Luis
 Stéphanie Gérard as Jennifer
 Arath de la Torre as Profesor Limón
 Kevin Holt as Malcom 
 Tamara Vallarta as Laurentina
 José Carlos Femat as Chema

References

External links 
 

2018 films
Mexican romantic comedy films
2018 romantic comedy films
2010s Spanish-language films
2010s Mexican films